Labode Popoola (born 28 September 1960) is a Nigerian academic. He is a professor of forest economics and was the 3rd substantive Vice-Chancellor of the Osun State University.

Early life
Poopola was born in Inisa, a local government area of Osun State. He obtained a Bachelor of Science, Honours in 1984 from the University of Ibadan. Following the completion of the compulsory one-year youth service program in 1985, he earned a master's degree in Forest Economics and Management (1987) and later received the doctor of philosophy in Forest Economics in 1990 all at the University of Ibadan.

Career
Poopola began his academic career in January 1988 as a Graduate assistant at University of Ibadan. He rose to the rank of senior lecturer in 1997 and became a full professor of Forest Economics in 2002. He contributed to the development of the curriculum for the teaching of forest management in Nigerian universities.

He served as the Head of Department of Forest Resources Management from 2005 to 2006. He later became Dean, Postgraduate school, University of Ibadan (2006-2010). He became Director for the Centre for Sustainable Development for University of Ibadan (2010-2016).

Professor Labode worked as an external examiner for over seventeen years at institutions includingFederal College of Forestry in Ibadan, Federal college of Forest Merchanization in Kaduna, University of Uyo, Enugu State University, Federal University of Technology  in Akure, Abeokuta, Markudi and in Yola, University College, Dublin, Ireland, UK.

Associations
He belongs to many professional associations, including:

 Association of Research Managers, (UK)
 African Sustainable Development Network
 United Nation Sustainable Development Solutions Network
 International Society of Tropical Foresters
 Commonwealth Forestry Association 
 African Network for Agroforestry Education
 Agroforestry Research Network for Africa
 Rural Development Forestry Network
 African Forest Research Network
 African Forest Forum
 West African Research 
 Innovation Management Association
 Forestry Association of Nigeria (Life Member, Fellow, National Secretary).

Publications
Poopola has written over 150 publications.

Recognition 

 Best all round student in academic, sports and character in Saint Patrick's College, Ibadan and Character 
 Service Award Ibadan Diocese in 1978
 Postgraduate scholar at University of Ibadan (1988 -1990)
 Executive Member in African Network for Agroforestry Education (1999-2001)
 Award for Invaluable Service in Agroforestry from the International Centre for Research in Agroforestry (2001). 
 National Contact Person, African Forest Research Network (2001-2010)
 Invaluable Service to the Forestry Profession from the Council of the Association of Nigeria (2002)
 National Chairman of  Inisa Descendants’ Union, the umbrella union for Inisa indigenes (2004-2010).

Personal life
Labode is a married man with kids.

References

Living people
1960 births
Vice-Chancellors of Nigerian universities
University of Ibadan alumni
Academic staff of the University of Ibadan